The Voice of America's Bethany Relay Station was located in Butler County, Ohio's Union Township about 25 miles (40 km) north of Cincinnati, adjacent to the transmitter site of WLW. Starting in 1944 during World War II it transmitted American radio programming abroad on shortwave frequencies, using 200,000-watt transmitters built by Crosley engineers under the direction of R.J. Rockwell. The site was developed to provide 'fallback' transmission facilities inland and away from the East Coast, where transmitters were located in Massachusetts, on Long Island in New York, and in New Jersey, all close to the ocean, subject to attack from German submarines or other invading forces.

Programming originated from studios in New York until 1954, when VOA headquarters moved to Washington.

The station operated until 1994. The facility took its name from the Liberty Township community of Bethany, which was about two miles north of the facility.

History
In 1943, the United States government bought nearly all of Section 12 of Township 3, Range 2 of the Symmes Purchase, the northeasternmost section of Union Township. From Hazel Beckley, 170 acres (688,000 m²) were purchased; from Philip Condon, 143 acres (579,000 m²); from Lola Gray Coy, 100 acres (405,000 m²); from John Miller, 69 acres (279,000 m²); and from Suzie Steinman, 142 acres (575,000 m²). The site was chosen for its elevation and its shallow bedrock and is today bounded by Tylersville Road on the south, Cox Road to the west, Liberty Way to the north, and Butler-Warren Road.

The transmitters were built by Powel Crosley Jr.'s Crosley Broadcasting Corporation about one mile west of the company's tower for WLW-AM in Mason. The Office of War Information began broadcasting in July 1944 and Adolf Hitler is said to have denounced the "Cincinnati liars". Following the war, with the OWI abolished, the facility was taken over by the State Department in 1945. It became part of the newly created United States Information Agency in 1953. The Crosley Broadcasting Corporation operated the facility for the government until November 1963, when the Voice of America assumed direct control.

At its peak the facility had six transmitters broadcasting with 250 kW and two transmitting with 50 kW.

The facility was closed on November 14, 1994; because of changing technologies, the transmissions shifted to satellites. The towers were brought down from December 1997 to February 1998.

Post-closure use
Most of the land was turned over to the county and township for use as a park.

Part in the southwest corner was sold to developers who have erected a shopping center called the Voice of America Centre.

The Miami University Voice of America Learning Center opened on the site in January 2009.

National Voice of America Museum of Broadcasting
The 30,000 sq. ft. former Bethany Station building at 8070 Tylersville Road has been transformed into the National Voice of America Museum of Broadcasting, a historical center about the history of The Voice of America, Powel Crosley, Jr. and radio and television.

Using a blueprint developed by Jack Rouse Associates, the facility features displays and interactive experiences that relate the story of the Voice of America and incorporate other related collections from Media Heritage and the Gray History of Wireless Museum in Cincinnati.

Displays include the radio station control room, re-creations of radio and television studios from the 1920s through the present, Old-time radio memorabilia and from the early days of television, and displays about area pioneers in the development of radio technology.

An amateur radio club, West Chester Amateur Radio Association, operates a  ham station using the callsign WC8VOA.

See also
 USCGC Courier (WAGR-410)

References

Further reading
Jim Blount. The 1900s: 100 Years In the History of Butler County, Ohio. Hamilton, Ohio: Past Present Press, 2000.
Virginia I. Shewalter. A History of Union Township, Butler County, Ohio. [West Chester, Ohio?]: The Author, 1979.
 Stern, David & Banks, Michael, CROSLEY: Two Brothers and a Business Empire that Transformed the Nation Cincinnati, Ohio: Clerisy Press, 2006.

External links
 National Voice of America Museum of Broadcasting
 Media Heritage: The Voice of America Museum of Broadcasting
AmateurLogic Special Presentation on the VOA Museum
Bob Heil from Ham Nation takes a tour of the VOA Museum

Telecommunications museums in the United States
Government buildings on the National Register of Historic Places in Ohio
Buildings and structures in Butler County, Ohio
National Register of Historic Places in Butler County, Ohio
International broadcasting

Art Deco architecture in Ohio
1944 establishments in Ohio
1994 disestablishments in Ohio
Voice of America
Telecommunications buildings on the National Register of Historic Places
Shortwave radio stations in the United States